The  is a monorail electric multiple unit (EMU) train type operated by the Tokyo Monorail on the Tokyo Monorail Haneda Airport Line in Japan since 1989.

Overview
The 1000 series trains were introduced from 1989 to replace earlier non-air-conditioned rolling stock and to provide increased capacity with the expansion and relocation of the terminal building at Haneda Airport.

Formation
, the fleet consists of 13 six-car sets (numbered 1001 to 1091) as shown below, with all cars motored. Car 1 is at the  end.

Interior
Passenger accommodation consists of a mixture of facing 4-seat bays.

History
The fleet of 16 trainsets was delivered between 1989 and 1996 in eight batches, batches 16 to 23, with differing seating configurations. The first set was delivered on 5 June 1989, with the last set delivered by 10 June 1996.

In 2002, the fleet was modified for wanman driver-only operation. In 2004, LED destination indicators were added to the sides of the trains, coinciding with the introduction of limited-stop "Rapid" services on the line. A programme of life-extension refurbishment was subsequently implemented, including new seat moquette. As of March 2014, five sets have been treated.

Livery variations
Originally delivered in a livery of black with red and white, the 1000 series trains were repainted from 2000 into a new livery of black, blue, orange, and white. A number of "revival" livery variations subsequently appeared, with set 1019 receiving a light blue and white "100 series style" livery in 2003, set 1085 receiving the original 1000 series style livery in 2013, and set 1049 receiving a red and white "500 series style" livery in 2014.

Awards
The 1000 series trains received the Japanese Good Design Award in 1990.

References

Electric multiple units of Japan
1000 series
Train-related introductions in 1989
750 V DC multiple units